The Inspector of the Navy is the commander of the Navy of the modern-day German Armed Forces, the Bundeswehr. Since the various bodies responsible for the high command of the German Navy were merged in 2012, the Inspector has been based at the Navy Command at Rostock. Before then, the Inspector was head of the Naval Staff of the Ministry of Defence, based in Bonn. Both the Inspector and his deputy hold the rank of vice admiral.

The Inspector is responsible for the readiness of personnel and materiel in the German Navy, in that regard he reports directly to the Federal Minister of Defence. The Inspector commands the Navy Command; however, the subordinate departments of the Navy are led by their heads at Navy Command and do not report directly to the Inspector. The Inspector sits under the General Inspector of the Bundeswehr and is a member of the Defence Council for Bundeswehr-wide matters.

List of Inspectors of the Navy

See also 
 Inspector of the Army
 Oberkommando der Marine
 Marineamt
 First Sea Lord
 List of admirals of the German Navy

References

External links 
  Inspekteure der Marine (Bundesarchiv)
  Inspekteure der Marine (German Navy official website)

Bundeswehr
German Navy admirals
Germany